Anne-Charlotte de Turckheim (born 5 April 1955) is a French actress, screenwriter, comedian and film producer. Born in Montereau-Fault-Yonne, Seine-et-Marne, France, the daughter of Françoise Husson and Arnaud de Turckheim, a member of a noble Protestant family from Alsace, Charlotte de Turckheim studied theater after completing her baccalauréat degree. She has appeared in numerous films.

In 2007, she participated in Rendez-vous en terre inconnue.

On Feb 25, 2014, it was announced that she would present a French version of the BBC's Antiques Roadshow 

The writer Émilie de Turckheim is her cousin. She is a descendant of the French automobile and aircraft engine manufacturer Adrien de Turckheim of the company Lorraine-Dietrich.

Filmography

Actress

Screenwriter / Director

Theater

References

External links
 
 
 Allociné

1955 births
Living people
People from Montereau-Fault-Yonne
French film actresses
French comedians
French film producers
20th-century French actresses
21st-century French actresses
French women screenwriters
French screenwriters
French women film directors
Cours Florent alumni
French women comedians